Jannat Ki Talash is a 1999 Pakistani film which won the Nigar Award for Best Film of the Year for 1999.

Plot summary
Jannat Ki Talash  is set in around the year 1947, when Pakistan was newly formed and revolves around Salma (Resham). Salma and Faraz (Shaan) had been in love before the creation of Pakistan and were fiancees. While Faraz lived in Lahore, Salma lived on the Indian side and frequently met each other. Although when the creation of Pakistan was announced, high proportionate of people where displaced and killed. Salma was presumed dead. It had been three years since her presumed death and Faraz's mother encourages Faraz to marry his cousin Rukhsana (Sana), which he disapproved but later unwillingly accepts. However Salma returns to Pakistan, upon learning this Faraz hurries to the police station to collect her. There she is lifeless, pale and does not say a word. She is described by Faraz's aunt as a 'living corpse' not saying anything instead feeling powerless and depressed. Faraz feels despondent that the women he once loved has turned into someone else. She does not speak until a turn of events take place and she is forced to defend herself in court. There Faraz forces her to talk of what happened to her in India and to defend herself. She finally speaks and talks of her experience.

Cast
 Resham
 Shaan
 Sana
 Saud
 Khushboo
 Abid Ali
 Shafqat Cheema
 Mustafa Qureshi

Awards

References

External links
 

1990s Urdu-language films
Pakistani romantic drama films
1999 films
Nigar Award winners
Urdu-language Pakistani films